Fernando Martín Zavala Lombardi (born February 16, 1971) is a Peruvian politician, who was the Prime Minister of Peru from 28 July 2016 to 17 September 2017. Previously he was the President of Backus and Johnston, a subsidiary of SABMiller. From 2005 to 2006 he was Minister of Economy and Finance.

Early life and education
Zavala was born in Tacna in 1971 to José Zavala Rey de Castro and María Fedora Elisabeth Lombardi Oyarzu. On his mother's side, he is the nephew of prominent Peruvian filmmaker Francisco J. Lombardi.

Following the completion of his high school education at the Colegio de la Inmaculada (the Jesuit school of Peru) in 1987, Zavala was admitted to the University of the Pacific, graduating in 1993 with a bachelor's degree in economics. He ultimately attained two Master's of Business Administration, from the University of Piura and the University of Birmingham, respectively.

Career
Zavala started his career in the private sector as assistant manager of Samtronics Peru. He was also Chief Financial Officer of Apoyo S.A. (Now Ipsos Perú S.A.), in the positions of consultant and pollster.

In 1995, Zavala was appointed CEO of Peru's National Institute for the Defense of Competition and Protection of Intellectual Property (INDECOPI), a position he held until 2000 in order to enter the Minister of Economy and Finance as a consultant.

Political career 
At the Minister of Economy and Finance led by Pedro Pablo Kuczynski, Zavala was appointed Deputy Minister of Economy in April 2002, serving through August 2005 as President Alejandro Toledo reshuffled his cabinet and named Kuczynski Prime Minister of Peru. In this reshuffle, Zavala succeeded Kuczynski in the Ministry, serving until the end of Toledo's presidential term in July 2006.

Upon retiring from the government, Zavala returned to the private sector as he began working at Backus and Johnston as Vice President of Strategy and Corporate Relations. After three years in office, he was named the president of National Brewery – SABMiller Panamá. In November 2013 he returned to Peru as President of Backus and Johnston. Zavala has been a member of the Boards of Directors of Interbank, Alicorp, inmobiliaria IDE, Cerveceria San Juan, Banco Falabella, and Enersur.

Prime Minister of Peru 
On July 15, 2016, President-elect Pedro Pablo Kuczynski confirmed him as head of his ministerial cabinet.  On July 28, during the inauguration, he was sworn in at a ceremony held in the courtyard of honor of the Government Palace, in the open air and in full view of the public. He held the office until 17 September 2017, after his cabinet was successfully censored by a vote of no confidence two days earlier.

On June 23, 2017, Fernando Zavala became the Minister of Economy and Finance replacing Alfredo Thorne.

References 

1971 births
Government ministers of Peru
Living people
Prime Ministers of Peru
Peruvian Ministers of Economy and Finance
University of the Pacific (Peru) alumni
University of Piura alumni
Peruvians for Change politicians
People from Tacna Region
People from Tacna